Sathing Phra is a district (amphoe) in the northern part of Songkhla province, southern Thailand.

Geography
Neighboring districts are (from the south clockwise): Singhanakhon of Songkhla Province; Pak Phayun of Phatthalung province; Krasae Sin and Ranot of Songkhla Province. To the east is the Gulf of Thailand.

The western part of the district is at the shore of the Thale Luang, the northern part of the Songkhla Lake.

History
The ancient port city of Satingpra was one of the most important trading centres of the Tambralinga Kingdom. Archaeological digs and investigations conducted toward the end of the 20th century testify to the existence of a fortified citadel protected by a moat and a quadrangular surrounding wall made of brick. A sophisticated system of canals connected the sea to the Songkhla Lake permitting the circulation of ships. The excavations brought to light artifacts of historical and artistic value. The modern district was originally named Chathing Phra. It was renamed Sathing Phra in 1961.

Administration
The district is divided into 11 sub-districts (tambons), which are further subdivided into 79 villages (mubans). Sathing Phra is a township (thesaban tambon) which covers parts of tambon Cha Thing Phra.

References

Districts of Songkhla province